80 for Brady is a 2023 American sports comedy film directed by Kyle Marvin, written by Sarah Haskins and Emily Halpern, and produced by former NFL quarterback Tom Brady. The film follows four lifelong friends (Lily Tomlin, Jane Fonda, Rita Moreno, and Sally Field) who travel to watch Brady and his New England Patriots play in Super Bowl LI in 2017. Billy Porter, Rob Corddry, Alex Moffat, and Guy Fieri also star.

80 for Brady was released in the United States on February 3, 2023 by Paramount Pictures. It received mixed reviews from critics and has grossed $39 million worldwide.

Plot
In 2017, Lou, Trish, Maura, and Betty are four best friends who are massive fans of the New England Patriots, particularly the team's star quarterback Tom Brady, 
having become fans in 2001 while celebrating Lou's successful completion of chemotherapy. 15 years later, the four women are celebrating the Patriots' victory over the Pittsburgh Steelers in the AFC Championship Game and make plans for the Super Bowl LI watch party. Lou floats the idea of actually going to the Super Bowl in person, but the other women are not interested due to the prohibitive cost. However, a local sports radio show runs a competition for free tickets, and the foursome enter by sharing the stories of their Patriots fandom. Later, Lou announces to the others that they won the tickets and they prepare their trip to Houston.

Lou, Trish, and Betty break Maura out of her retirement facility with help from Maura's friend Mickey, and the four women fly to Houston. The next day, they go to the NFL Experience, where Betty wins a chicken wing eating contest hosted by Guy Fieri, but loses her fanny pack with the tickets. Trish meets former NFL player Dan O'Callahan and mutual attraction forms between them, but Trish is uncertain as she has not had a very successful love life; Dan invites her to a party, and the women decide to go upon learning about the loss of the tickets as Fieri will also be there. At the party, the women are given cannabis edibles which severely disorient them. Maura joins in on a celebrity game of poker and wins several hands in order to potentially buy new tickets, only to learn that the game is for charity; she gives her winnings to the charity of her top competitor, Gugu. Unable to find Fieri, the foursome return to their hotel and decide to resume searching in the morning.

The next day, the women go back to the NFL Experience but find it has closed down. They then go to the tailgate parties around NRG Stadium to see if they can buy any tickets from scalpers, but have nowhere near enough money to buy even one ticket. Trish finds the radio hosts they won the tickets from and brings up the situation to them, but they are confused as they gave their tickets to a different group. Betty finds Fieri at the tailgate and recovers the bag with the tickets but when the women attempt to enter the stadium, the security guards reveal that the tickets are fake. Lou confesses that she bought the "tickets" online for an exorbitant price along with trading away her car, as she wanted to have one last fun memory with her friends before she hears back from her doctors as she fears that her cancer may have returned. The other women console her and agree that even if they could not make it into the game, they are satisfied with all of their other great memories. To their luck, however, they run into Gugu, who gets them in under the guise of being backup dancers for Lady Gaga's halftime performance out of gratitude for Maura's actions the previous night. Despite the security guards clearly seeing through the deception, they are impressed by the four's dance moves and determination and allow them in anyway.

The quartet are about to be thrown out again by a different security guard when they run into Dan who invites them into his box suite as his guests. Concerned as they watch the Atlanta Falcons build a 28-3 lead over the Patriots, they decide to take action and sneak into the Patriots coordinators' booth. Betty hijacks the defensive coordinator's headset and uses her vast knowledge of math to give a playcall which leads to a sack, while Lou talks to Brady and gives him an inspirational message, explaining how he helped her get through her chemo treatment, which causes the quarterback to gain renewed energy. The quartet return to their box suite and watch in jubilation as Brady leads the Patriots to a comeback victory. Maura reveals she made back the money Lou spent on the fake tickets by making a bet on the Patriots winning with the owner of the suite. The women are approached again by security, and escorted to the Patriots' locker room, and thanked by the players for their dedication, including Brady.

Three years later, Trish, Maura, Betty, and Lou, along with Mickey and Lou's daughter Sara, prepare to watch Brady's first game with his new team the Tampa Bay Buccaneers, wearing combination Patriots/Buccaneers Brady jerseys and it is revealed that Lou is perfectly fine. Sometime later, the four women sit on a beach with Brady discussing their retirements.

Cast

Brady's former Patriots teammates Rob Gronkowski, Danny Amendola and Julian Edelman have cameo appearances as themselves.

Production
It was announced in February 2022 that Tom Brady, then recently retired for the first time from his football career, would produce and appear in the film, to be directed and cowritten by Kyle Marvin. The film is inspired by a real-life group of Patriots fans known as the "Over 80 for Brady" club; the grandson of one member pitched the idea for a film.  Lily Tomlin, Jane Fonda, Rita Moreno and Sally Field  also joined the cast. In March, Sara Gilbert, Glynn Turman, Bob Balaban, Ron Funches, Jimmy O. Yang and Harry Hamlin were added to the cast. That same month, Brady reversed his decision to retire from the NFL, although he eventually retired for good in February 2023. Marvin said that the announcement was "certainly news to us, so we had to adapt."

Filming began by March 2022, with the production receiving a tax credit to film in California.  In June, filming wrapped, with Billy Porter and Guy Fieri added to the cast. By July 14, 2022, former Patriots Rob Gronkowski, Danny Amendola and Julian Edelman joined the film.

Music
The film's score was composed by John Debney in November 2022. The soundtrack single "Gonna Be You" was released January 20, 2023. The song was written by Diane Warren, and performed by Dolly Parton, Belinda Carlisle, Cyndi Lauper, Gloria Estefan, and Debbie Harry. The official music video shows Parton, Carlisle, Lauper, and Estefan performing while wearing football jerseys similar to the ones worn by the women in the film, interspersed with clips from the film. The official Debney's score album for the film was released on February 9, 2023 by Paramount Music.

Release
80 for Brady was released in theaters by Paramount Pictures on February 3, 2023. Two days before the film's release, Brady announced his retirement from the NFL after 23 seasons.

Reception

Box office 
In the United States and Canada, 80 for Brady was released alongside Knock at the Cabin, and was projected to gross around $10 million from 3,912 theaters in its opening weekend. The film made $4.7 million on its first day, which includes $1.3 million from previews on Tuesday, Wednesday, and Thursday leading up to its release. It went on to debut to $12.5 million, finishing second behind Knock at the Cabin, though it actually sold more tickets, 1.3 million to 1.1 million. Of the opening weekend audience, 47% were over the age of 55 and 69% were women, with much of the sales coming from matinee showtimes. The film made $6 million in its second weekend (a drop of 53%), finishing fourth.

Critical response
  Audiences surveyed by CinemaScore gave the film an average grade of "A–" on an A+ to F scale, while those polled by PostTrak gave it an 85% positive score, with 68% saying they would definitely recommend it.

Notes

References

External links
 
 

2023 comedy films
2023 directorial debut films
2020s American films
2020s buddy comedy films
2020s comedy road movies
2020s English-language films
2020s female buddy films
2020s sports comedy films
American buddy comedy films
American comedy road movies
American female buddy films
American films based on actual events
American football films
American sports comedy films
Comedy films based on actual events
Films about fandom
Films about old age
Films scored by John Debney
Films set in 2017
Films set in Houston
Films shot in California
New England Patriots
Paramount Pictures films
Sports films based on actual events
Super Bowl in fiction
Tom Brady
Films shot in Houston